Marcello "Chelo" Michelangel Anthony Pisas (born 4 September 1977) is a Curaçao professional footballer who plays as a goalkeeper for Centro Social Deportivo Barber in Netherlands Antilles First League. Pisas has appeared for the Netherlands Antilles national football team.

References

External links

1977 births
Living people
Curaçao footballers
People from Willemstad
Netherlands Antilles international footballers
Curaçao international footballers
Dual internationalists (football)
Sekshon Pagá players
Association football goalkeepers
Centro Social Deportivo Barber players